Omiodes blackburni, the coconut leafroller, is a species of moth in the family Crambidae. It is endemic to the Hawaiian islands of Kauai, Oahu, Molokai, Maui, Lanai and Hawaii. The species was first described by Arthur Gardiner Butler in 1877.

Recorded food plants include Cocos nucifera, but it occasionally also feeds on Pritchardia (including Pritchardia pacifica), banana and introduced palms.

Young larvae feed gregariously on the underside of the leaf of their host plant protected by a thin web of silk. At first they eat the substance of the leaf and leave the opposite epidermis. They soon scatter more or less, and make hiding places by fastening together the lower edges of coconut leaflets. Often several caterpillars can be found in the same place. As they become slightly larger, they eat the whole substance, eating from the edge, and not leaving the epidermis. When the leaflet is mostly eaten, they migrate to other leaflets. Larvae are full grown in about four weeks from hatching. Full-grown larvae are 32–35 mm long and dull greenish, with two dorsal whitish lines.

Pupation takes place in a slight cocoon in the caterpillar's retreat. The pupa is 15–19 mm long and light to dark brown according. The pupal period lasts 11–13 days.

External links

Insects of Hawaii

blackburni
Moths described in 1877
Endemic moths of Hawaii